This is a list of notable Serbs of Croatia, ethnic Serbs who were born in, lived, or trace their origins to the territory that is present-day Croatia.

Arts
Joakim Marković (c. 1685–1757), Austrian Serb painter
Zaharije Orfelin (1726–1785), Austrian Serb polymath, born in Vukovar
Stefan von Novaković (1740–1826), writer and publisher
Lukijan Mušicki (1777–1837), notable Baroque poet, writer and polyglot
Jovan Došenović (1781–1813), philosopher, poet and translator
Jovan Isailović, Jr. (1803–1885), academic painter during the early and mid-nineteenth century
Božidar Petranović (1809–1874), author, scholar, and journalist
Matija Ban (1818–1903), poet, dramatist, and playwright, a part of the Serb-Catholic movement in Dubrovnik
Danilo Medaković (1819–1881), writer, journalist and publisher
Medo Pucić (1821–1882), writer and politician,  a part of the Serb-Catholic movement in Dubrovnik
Josif Runjanin (1821–1878), composer of the Croatian national anthem
Nikola Arsenović (1823–1887),  designer and illustrator of folk costumes
Branko Radičević (1824–1853), poet
Ljudevit Vuličević (1839–1916), poet
Slavka Atanasijević (1850–1897),  pianist and composer
Simo Matavulj (1852–1908), Serbian novelist
Ivo Vojnović (1857–1929), writer, a part of the Serb-Catholic movement in Dubrovnik
Marko Car (1859–1953), writer, politician and activist,  a part of the Serb-Catholic movement in Dubrovnik
Marko Murat (1864–1944), painter,  a part of the Serb-Catholic movement in Dubrovnik
Lujo Bakotić (1867–1941), writer
Ivo Ćipiko (1869–1923), writer, primarily a novelist
Simeon Roksandić (1874–1943), sculptor
Toma Rosandić (1878–1958), Yugoslav sculptor, born in Split 
Stojan Aralica (1883–1980), impressionist painter and academic
Veljko Milićević (1886–1929), writer, translator, publicist and journalist
Ignjat Job (1895–1936), expressionist painter
Vladimir Velmar-Janković (1895–1976), writer
Ljubomir Micić (1895–1971),  poet and writer, the founder of Zenitism
Sava Šumanović (1896–1942), Serbian painter
Branko Ve Poljanski (1898–1947), Serbian poet
John David Brcin (1899–1983), American sculptor
Marko Tajčević (1900–1984), composer and musician
Živko Stojsavljević (1900–1978), Serbian painter, born in Benkovac
Mihailo Vukdragović (1900–1967), Serbian composer and conductor
Dragan Aleksić (1901–1958), Yugoslav Dadaist poet, author, journalist, filmmaker
Vladan Desnica (1905–1967), Yugoslav writer, born in Zadar
Grigorije Vitez (1911–1966), poet, children's novelist and translator, founder of the Croatian modern children's literature
Vojin Bakić (1915–1992), Yugoslav sculptor of monuments such as Monument to the uprising of the people of Kordun and Banija, born in Bjelovar
Vojin Jelić (1921–2004), Yugoslav and Croatian poet, born in Knin
Arsen Diklić (1922–1995), writer and screenwriter
Petar Omčikus (1926–2019), painter and academic
Pero Kvrgić (born 1927), Yugoslav Croatian actor, born in Vrbovsko 
Dušan Džamonja  (1928-2009), sculptor
Milorad Pavić (1929–2009), Serbian writer and university professor with roots in Žumberak
Renata Ulmanski (born 1929), Serbian actress
Bora Ćosić (born 1932), Serbian and Croatian writer
Đorđe Kadijević (born 1933), Serbian film director
Slobodan Selenić (1933–1995), writer, critic, professor and director of Avala Film
Boris Spremo (1935-2017), Canadian photojournalist, the first photojournalist to receive the Order of Canada
Branka Petrić (born 1937), Serbian actress
Dragomir Čumić (1937–2013), Serbian actor
Arsen Dedić (1938–2015), chanson singer
Božidarka Frajt (born 1940), Yugoslav and Croatian actress
Petar Kralj (1941–2011), Serbian actor, born in Zagreb, parents from Banija
Milan Milišić (1941–1991), writer,  a part of the Serb-Catholic movement in Dubrovnik
Ratko Adamović (1942), writer
Rade Šerbedžija (born 1946), former Yugoslav film actor, from Lika
 Neda Ukraden (born 1950), pop singer
 Miljen Kljaković (born 1950), award-winning production designer
Jovan Radulović (1951–2018), Serbian writer and former director of Belgrade City Library
Bogdan Diklić (born 1953), Serbian actor 
Boris Miljković (born 1956), film director and creative director
Boris Komnenić (born 1957), Serbian actor
Milan Mladenović (1958–1994), musician best known as the frontman of the Yugoslav art rock band Ekatarina Velika
Goran Šepa (1958), musician best known as the frontman of Kerber. Both of his parents are from Velika Popina
Suzana Petričević (born 1959), actress
Momčilo Bajagić (born 1960), Serbian musician
Zoran Bognar (born 1965), Serbian poet and editor
Vladimir Arsenijević (born 1965), writer and journalist, NIN award winner
Nikola Škorić (born 1976), Serbian comedian
Tanja Stupar-Trifunović (born 1977), writer from Bosnia, winner of the European Union Prize for Literature
Stana Katic (born 1978), Canadian-American film and television actress

Science and academia
Stefan Vujanovski (1743–1829), Serbian education reformer and author of several textbook
Pavle Solarić (1779–1821), Serbian linguist, geographer, archaeologist, poet, bibliographer and man of letters
Sava Mrkalj (1783–1833), Serbian linguist and poet, born in Kordun.
Jovan Gavrilović (1796–1877), historian, politician, statesman, and public figure. He was the first President of the Serbian Learned Society. 
Nikola Arsenović (1823–1887), designer and illustrator of folk costumes
Valtazar Bogišić (1834–1908), jurist and a pioneer in sociology,  a part of the Serb-Catholic movement in Dubrovnik
Pero Budmani (1835–1914), writer, linguist, grammarian, and philologist,  a part of the Serb-Catholic movement in Dubrovnik
Vicko Adamović (1838–1919), pedagogue and historian
Nikodim Milaš (1845–1915), Orthodox bishop, born in Šibenik.
Luko Zore (1846–1906), philologist and Slavist,  a part of the Serb-Catholic movement in Dubrovnik
Vid Vuletić Vukasović (1853–1933), writer and early ethnographer,  a part of the Serb-Catholic movement in Dubrovnik
Nikola Tesla (1856–1943), Serbian-American inventor, mechanical engineer, and electrical engineer.
Milan Rešetar (1860–1942), linguist, historian and literary critic,  a part of the Serb-Catholic movement in Dubrovnik
Mihailo Merćep (1864–1937), Serbian cyclist and aviation pioneer, born in Dubrovnik
Antun Fabris (1864–1904), journalist, essayist, publisher and politician,  a part of the Serb-Catholic movement in Dubrovnik
Lujo Adamović (1864–1935), botanist
Vladimir Varićak (1865–1942), mathematician and theoretical physicist
Milutin Milanković (1879–1958), Serbian geophysicist and civil engineer, born in Dalj
Dušan Vuksan (1881–1944), pedagogue and historian
Ivan Đaja (1884–1957),  Serbian biologist and physiologist
Miloš N. Đurić (1892–1967), classical philologist, hellenist, classical translator and philosopher
Milan Kašanin (1895–1981), Serbian art historian, curator and writer
Jovan Karamata (1902–1967), Serbian mathematician, born in Zagreb
Danilo Blanuša (1903–1987), Yugoslav mathematician and physicist, born in Osijek
Đuro Kurepa (1907–1993) - mathematician, best known for the Kurepa tree
Gojko Nikoliš (1911–1995), doctor, general, diplomat, historian and academic
Jevrem Jezdić (1916–1997), historian and writer
Smilja Avramov (1918–2018), Serbian international law scholar
Dejan Medaković (1922–2008), Serbian historian and president of SANU
Nikola Hajdin (1923–2019) construction engineer and President of SANU
Vojislav Korać (1924–2010), historian of architecture and professor
Gajo Petrović (1927–1993), Yugoslav philosopher, born in Karlovac
Sima Ćirković (1929–2009), Serbian historian, born in Osijek. 
Svetozar Kurepa (1929–2010) - mathematician
Vojin Dimitrijević (1932–2012), law professor
Nikola Moravčević (born 1935), Serbian-American literary historian, literary critic, academic and novelist
Branko Mikasinovich (born 1938), American Slavist
Darko Tanasković (born 1948), Serbian orientalist, academic and diplomat
Marko Atlagić (born 1949), Serbian historian, born in Ostrovica
Ivo Visković (born 1949), Serbian university professor and diplomat
Dejan Jović (born 1968), professor at the Faculty of Political Science at the University of Zagreb
Srđan Majstorović (born 1972), political scientist
Spiridon Brusina (1845–1909) - zoologist

Sports
Milan Neralić (1875–1918), Austro-Hungarian and Croatian fencer, the first person from Croatia to take part in the Olympic Games and the first one to win a medal
Petar Trifunović (1910–1980), Yugoslav chess champion, born in Dubrovnik
Press Maravich (1915–1987), American basketball player and coach. Both of his parents are from Ogulin
Radivoje Ognjanović (born 1933), football manager and player
Petar Nadoveza (born 1942), football player and manager
Milan Nenadić (born 1943), wrestler
Milan Damjanović (1943–2006), football player and manager
Ilija Petković (born 1945), football player and manager
Ratomir Dujković (born 1946), Serbian football player and coach
Ljubomir Vračarević (1947–2013), Serbian martial artist and founder of Real Aikido
Nikola Plećaš (born 1948), Croatian basketball player
Božidar Maljković (born 1952), Serbian basketball coach, four-time Euroleague champion, former player
Vladimir Ilić (born 1955), shot putter
Mira Bjedov (born 1955), former basketball player and Olympic bronze medalist (1980 Summer Olympics, Moscow)
Zvjezdan Cvetković (1960-2017), football player and former manager of GNK Dinamo Zagreb
Borislav Cvetković (born 1962), football player
Dragan Andrić (born 1962), Serbian water polo player, two-time Olympic champion
Dražen Petrović (1964–1993), Croatian basketball player, born to a Serb father and a Croat mother, World and European champion
Jasna Šekarić (born 1965), Serbian sports shooter, five-time Olympic medalist, World and European champion
Siniša Mihajlović (born 1969), Serbian football manager and former player, European Cup champion
Aleksandar Jovančević  (born 1970), Serbian strength and conditioning coach and former wrestler
Miloš Milošević (born 1972), former Croatian swimmer, World and European champion
Goran Bunjevčević (1973-2018), Serbian football player
Vladimir Vujasinović (born 1973), Serbian water polo player and manager, three-time Olympic medalist, World and European champion
Miladin Dado Pršo (born 1974), retired Croatian footballer, born in Zadar
Dušan Vemić (born 1976), tennis coach and former player
Predrag Savović (born 1976), basketball player
Nenad Čanak (born 1976), Serbian basketball player and manager
Predrag Stojaković (born 1977), Serbian basketball player, World, European and NBA champion
Danijel Ljuboja (born 1978), Serbian football player
Boško Balaban (born 1978), retired Croatian footballer, born in Rijeka
Ivan Ergić (born 1981), Serbian football player
Svetlana Ognjenović (born 1981), Serbian handball player, World Championship silver medalist
Marko Popović (born 1982), Croatian former professional basketball player
Novica Bjelica (born 1983), Serbian volleyball player
Jelena Dokić (born 1983), former tennis player and coach
Duško Savanović (born 1983), Serbian basketball player
Damir Mikec (born 1984), Serbian sports shooter, European Games champion
Jelena Popović (born 1984), Serbian handball player, World Championship silver medalist
Aleks Marić (born 1984), Australian basketball player
Danijel Subašić (born 1984), Croatian footballer
Dejan Jakovic (born 1985), Canadian football player
Kosta Perović (born 1985), Serbian basketballer player, Eurobasket silver medalist
Zoran Erceg (born 1985), Serbian basketball player
Dragan Travica (born 1986), Italian volleyball player, Olympic bronze medalist
Konstantin Čupković (born 1987),  Serbian volleyball player
Andrija Prlainović (born 1987), Serbian water polo player, Olympic, World and European champion, born in Dubrovnik
Milan Borjan (born 1987), Canadian football player
Marko Jagodić-Kuridža (born 1987), Serbian basketball player 
Sava Lešić (born 1988), Serbian basketball player
Milan Mačvan (born 1989), Serbian basketball player, Olympic and Eurobasket silver medalist
Maja Škorić (born 1989), Serbian basketball player
Nataša Zorić (born 1989), tennis player
Marta Drpa (born 1989), Serbian volleyball player
Milica Deura (born 1990), Bosnian basketball player
Đorđe Gagić (born 1990), Serbian basketball player
Danijel Aleksić (born 1991), Serbian footballer, UEFA European Under-17 Championship Golden Player Award
Tanja Dragić (born 1991), Serbian Paralympian athlete, paralympic and world champion
Milan Zorica (born 1992), Serbian footballer
Marija Vuković (born 1992), state champion of Montenegro, specializing in the high jump
Nemanja Bezbradica (born 1993), Serbian basketball player, 3x3 Youth Olympic champion
Bojan Sanković, (born 1993), Montenegrin football player
Saša Ivković, (born 1993), Serbian football player
Miloš Degenek (born 1994), Australian football player
Aleksandar Čavrić (born 1994), Serbian football player
Ognjen Dobrić (born 1994), Serbian basketball player
Dejan Miljuš and Bojan Miljuš (born 1994), Serbian football players
Miloš Perišić (born 1995), Serbian football player
Đorđe Ivanović (born 1995), Serbian football player
Milan Gajić (born 1996), Serbian football player

Politics
Beloš Vukanović (1110–1198), Serbian prince, Ban of Croatia between 1142 and 1163
Ognjeslav Utješenović (1817–1890), politician and writer
Nikola Krestić (1824–1887), nobleman, politician, attorney at law and President of Sabor
Nikša Gradi (1825–1894), writer, politician, and lawyer,  a part of the Serb-Catholic movement in Dubrovnik
Konstantin Vojnović (1832–1903), politician, university professor and rector of the University of Zagreb
Đorđe Vojnović (1833–1895), politician,  a part of the Serb-Catholic movement in Dubrovnik
Sava Bjelanović (1850–1897), politician and journalist
Bogdan Medaković (1854–1930), lawyer, politician and Speaker of the Croatian Sabor from 1908 to 1918
Lujo Vojnović (1864–1951), writer, politician, and diplomat,  a part of the Serb-Catholic movement in Dubrovnik
Svetozar Pribićević (1875–1936), Kingdom of Yugoslavia politician, born in Kostajnica
Milan Pribićević (1876–1937), politician and leader of ORJUNA
Adam Pribićević (1880–1957), publisher, writer, politician and supporter of the social philosophy of Tomáš Masaryk
Stijepo Kobasica (1882–1944), journalist, author and politician,  a part of the Serb-Catholic movement in Dubrovnik
Kata Pejnović (1899–1966), feminist and politician
Milka Planinc (1924-2010), communist politician of mixed Serbo-Croatian background
 Jovan Rašković (1929–1992), politician who first called for Serb autonomy within Croatia in the 1990s
 Milan Đukić (1934–2007),  former deputy speaker of the Croatian Sabor
 Mirko Marjanović (1937–2006), a former Prime Minister of Serbia and a high-ranking official in Slobodan Milošević's Socialist Party of Serbia 
Vojislav Vukčević (1938–2016), politician, minister for diaspora
Petar Škundrić (born 1947), politician, former minister cabinet minister
Drago Kovačević (1953–2019), former mayor of Knin
 Milan Martić (born 1954), the third president of the Republic of Serbian Krajina, born in Knin
 Milan Babić (1956–2006), the first president of the Republic of Serbian Krajina, born in Vrlika
 Goran Hadžić (1958–2016), the second president of the Republic of Serbian Krajina, born in Vinkovci

Active
 Slobodan Uzelac (born 1947), Croatian politician
 Savo Štrbac (born 1949), Croatian Serb activist
 Vojislav Stanimirović (1953), Croatian politician
 Milorad Pupovac (born 1955), Croatian Serb politician (SDSS)
 Sanda Rašković Ivić (born 1956), Serbian psychiatristand politician, (NS)
 Veljko Ostojić (born 1958), Croatian politician, former Minister of Tourism
 Ratko Dmitrović (born 1958), Serbian politician and journalist, Minister of Families and Demographics
 Janko Veselinović (1965), Serbian politician, lawyer and university professor
 Željko Jovanović (born 1965), Crotian politician
 Milanka Opačić (born 1968), Croatian politician, (SDP) 
 Miodrag Linta (born 1969), politician and activist
 Boris Milošević (born 1974), Croatian lawyer and politician, current Deputy Prime Minister, (SDSS)
 Aleksandar Martinović (born 1976), Serbian lawyer and politician, (SNS)
 Dragan Crnogorac (born 1978), Croatian politician, MP and  President of Joint Council of Municipalities
 Nebojša Bakarec (born 1963), Serbian politician (SNS)

Military

Venetian period
Janko Mitrović (1613–1659)
Stojan Janković (1636–1687)
Vuk Mandušić (fl. 1645–1648)
Cvijan Šarić (fl. 1652–1668)

Habsburg/Ottoman period and the Kingdom of Serbia
Stevan Šupljikac (1786–1848), Serbian rebel and first Duke of Serbian Vojvodina
Omar Pasha (1806–1871), Ottoman field marshal and governor
Gavrilo Rodić (1812–1890), Austrian and Austro-Hungarian general
Stjepan Jovanović (1828–1885), notable military commander of Austrian Empire
Emanuel Cvjetićanin (1833–1919), Austro-Hungarian Field Marshal Liteant
Đura Horvatović (1835–1895), Serbian general and military minister
Miloš Božanović (1863–1922), Serbian military commander and Minister of Defence
Dragutin Prica (1867–1960), Austro-Hungarian and later Yugoslav admiral
Vasilije Trbić (1881–1962),  Serbian Chetnik commander in Macedonia
Raoul Stojsavljevic (1887–1930),  Austro-Hungarian WWI flying ace credited with ten aerial victories

World War II
Milan Emil Uzelac (1867–1954), commander in the Austro-Hungarian, Yugoslav and Independent Croatian Air forces, born in Hungary. 
Božidar Adžija (1890–1941), Yugoslav communist activist
Vladimir Ćopić (1891–1939),  journalist and communist official of mixed Serb-Croatian origin
Branko Vukelić (1904–1945), spy for Richard Sorge's circle
Momčilo Đujić (1907–1999), Chetnik commander in World War II, born near Knin 
Vladimir Velebit (1907–2004), Yugoslav partisan, diplomat and historian
Rade Končar (1911–1942), Yugoslav partisan and National Hero, born near Korenica
Filip Kljajić (1913–1943), Yugoslav partisan and National Hero, born near Petrinja
Slobodan Bajić Paja (1916–1943), Yugoslav partisan and National Hero, born near Vukovar
Rade Bulat (1920–2013), Yugoslav communist, partisan general, electrical engineer and People's Hero of Yugoslavia
Branko Mamula (born 1921), antifascist and partisan fighter, admiral of the JNA, Minister of Defence of Yugoslavia (1982–1988)
Nada Dimić (1923–1942), Yugoslav communist and People's Hero of Yugoslavia, born in Divoselo (Gospić)
Simo Dubajić (1923-2009), Yugoslav partisan
Jovanka Broz (1924–2013), Yugoslav partisan and the First Lady of Yugoslavia
Boško Buha (1926–1943), Yugoslav partisan and National Hero, born in Virovitica 
Božidar Adžija (1890–1941), Yugoslav communist activist
Stevo Rađenović, Chetnik commander in World War II

Croatian War
Veljko Kadijević (1925–2014), JNA general, born in Imotski
Mile Mrkšić (1947–2015), JNA colonel, born in Vrginmost
Slavko Dokmanović (1949–1998), mayor of Vukovar
Mile Novaković (1950–2015), SVK commander, born in Vrginmost
Vukašin Šoškoćanin (1958–1991), SVK commander, born in Borovo

Modern
Zdravko Ponoš (born 1958), Serbian general  and the former Chief of the General Staff of the Serbian Armed Forces

Clergy and Other
Clergy
Jelena Nemanjić Šubić (14th century), founder of Krka monastery
Petronije Selaković (fl. 1648), monk and rebel leader
Nikodim Busović (1657–1707), Serbian Orthodox Metropolitan of Krka 
Simeon Končarević (1690–1769), Serbian Orthodox Metropolitan
Gerasim Zelić (1752–1838), Serbian Orthodox archimandrite, traveler, and writer
Holy Martyr Teodor Komogovinski (18th century)
Vikentije Ljuština (1761–1805), Serbian Orthodox archimandrite, writer and educator
Josif Rajačić (1785–1861), metropolitan of Sremski Karlovci, Serbian patriarch, administrator of Serbian Vojvodina and baron
Petar Jovanović (1800–1864), metropolitan of Belgrade
Mato Vodopić (1816–1893), bishop of Dubrovnik who wrote poems, short stories and collected folk ballads,  a part of the Serb-Catholic movement in Dubrovnik
Nikanor Ivanović (1825–1894), metropolitan of Montenegro
Ivan Stojanović (1829–1900), priest and writer,  a part of the Serb-Catholic movement in Dubrovnik
Bishop NIkolaj (1840–1907), theologian and Metropolitan of the Metropolitanate of Dabar-Bosna
Miron Nikolić (1846–1941), one of the bishops of the Serbian Orthodox Church with the longest standing record in the profession
German Opačić (1857–1899), Bishop of Bačka
Evgenije Letica (1858–1933), theologian and Serbian Orthodox Metropolitan
Branko Dobrosavljević (1886 —1941), Serbian Orthodox priest who fell victim to Ustaše during the Genocide of Serbs in the Independent State of Croatia
Hieromartyr Georgije Bogić (1911–1941)
Serbian Patriarch Pavle (1914–2009)
Jovan Nikolić, Serbian Orthodox priest
Jovan Pavlović (1936–2014), Serbian Orthodox Metropolitan

Other
Vladimir Matijević (1854–1929), founder of the Serbian Business Association Privrednik, the biggest Serbian humanitarian society, Serbian bank and Union of agricultural cooperatives
Lazar Bačić (1865–1941), merchant and philanthropist
Marija Ilić Agapova (1895–1984), jurist, translator, librarian and the first director of the Belgrade City Library
Jovo Stanisavljević Čaruga (1897–1925), outlaw in early 20th-century Slavonia
Milan Mandarić (born 1938), Serbian-American business tycoon
Stevo Karapandža (born 1947), celebrity chef, born in Gornja Trebinja (Karlovac)
Mirjana Rakić (born 1948), Croatian journalist
Slavko Ćuruvija (1949–1999), Yugoslav journalist and newspaper publisher
Miroslav Lazanski (1950–2021), journalist and MP
Mirko Ilić (born 1956), graphic designer and comics artist
Slavica Ecclestone (born 1958), model 
Nives Celsius (born 1981), Croatian socialite
Dragana Atlija (born 1983), Serbian model, actress, Miss Serbia 2009

See also
List of Serbs
List of Serbs of Bosnia and Herzegovina
List of Serbs of Montenegro
List of Serbs of the Republic of Macedonia
List of Serbs of Slovenia
List of Serbs of Albania

References

Sources

List
Serbs of Croatia
Croatia